George H. Clarke (June 28, 1840 - October 3, 1906) was an American stage actor.  He had a long association with Augustin Daly.

He acted in many productions that also featured Ada Rehan, and also played with Clara Morris and Fanny Davenport.

Clark was born with the surname O'Neill in Brooklyn in 1840.  He first appeared on stage in 1855, playing juvenile roles with Hight & Hyde.

Selected roles (incomplete)
 The Rajah (1883) - Harold Wyncot (the Rajah) 
 The Foresters (1892) - King Richard, Coeur de Lion

References

External links
George Clarke portrait gallery(New York Public Library, Billy Rose collection)

American male stage actors
1906 deaths
1840 births
19th-century American male actors